George Ronald Livingstone (October 9, 1925 – August 26, 1991) was an American professional basketball player. Livingstone was the sixth overall pick in the 1949 BAA draft by the Baltimore Bullets. He played for the Bullets for just sixteen games in his rookie season before he was traded to the Philadelphia Warriors for Ed Sadowski and cash. He played for the Warriors until 1951. Prior to the professional leagues, Livingstone was an AAU All-American while playing for the Oakland Bittners in 1946–47.

NBA career statistics

Regular season

Playoffs

References

External links

1925 births
1991 deaths
Amateur Athletic Union men's basketball players
American men's basketball players
Baltimore Bullets (1944–1954) draft picks
Baltimore Bullets (1944–1954) players
Basketball players from Oakland, California
Centers (basketball)
Junior college men's basketball players in the United States
Modesto Junior College alumni
Philadelphia Warriors players
Saint Mary's Gaels men's basketball players
Wyoming Cowboys basketball players